Conus behelokensis is a species of sea snail, a marine gastropod mollusk in the family Conidae, the cone snails, cone shells or cones.

These snails are predatory and venomous. They are capable of "stinging" humans.

Description
The size of the shell varies between 34 mm and 65 mm.

Distribution
This marine species of cone snail occurs in the Western Indian Ocean.

References

 Filmer R.M. (2001). A Catalogue of Nomenclature and Taxonomy in the Living Conidae 1758 - 1998. Backhuys Publishers, Leiden. 388pp
 Monnier E., Batifoix J.L. & Limpalaër L. (2018). Darioconus rosiae (Gastropoda: Conidae) a new species of the Darioconus pennaceus complex from South-West Madagascar. Xenophora Taxonomy. 19: 9-24. page(s): 10, pl. 1 figs 1–11; pl. 2 figs 1–11; pl. 3 figs 1-10
 Puillandre N., Duda T.F., Meyer C., Olivera B.M. & Bouchet P. (2015). One, four or 100 genera? A new classification of the cone snails. Journal of Molluscan Studies. 81: 1-23

External links
 To World Register of Marine Species
 Cone Shells - Knights of the Sea
 

behelokensis
Gastropods described in 1989